This was a new event in the ITF Women's Circuit.

Viktorija Golubic won the inaugural title, defeating Nicole Gibbs in the final, 6–2, 6–1.

Seeds

Main draw

Finals

Top half

Bottom half

References 
 Main draw

Waco Showdown - Singles